Stanhope is an unincorporated community in Ashtabula and Trumbull counties, in the U.S. state of Ohio.

History
A post office was established at Stanhope in 1891, and remained in operation until 1893. The community has the name of one Captain Stanhope.

References

Unincorporated communities in Ashtabula County, Ohio
Unincorporated communities in Trumbull County, Ohio
1891 establishments in Ohio
Unincorporated communities in Ohio